The European Youth Parliament is a politically unbound non-profit organisation, which encourages European youth to actively engage in citizenship and cultural understanding.
It involves 50,000 youngsters from all around Europe in its events and has around 6,000 active members in the different countries. It was established in 1987 in Fontainebleau, France.

History 

The European Youth Parliament was founded by Laurent Grégoire (FR) and Bettina Carr-Allinson (NL), initially as a school project at the Lycée François-Ier in Fontainebleau, to the south of Paris. It is there that three of the first four International Sessions were held, starting in 1988, about a year after the idea took place.

It then developed steadily for a few years until it moved to Witney, Oxfordshire, in 1991, and was legally recognised as the European Youth Parliament International Ltd., a subsidiary of a charity created in 1992 for this purpose, the Fontainebleau Youth Foundation. 
The organisation experienced an enduring growth for the next ten years, its network counting an increasing number of National Committees and its activities becoming both larger and more numerous. The National Committees stretch beyond the scope of countries within the European Union and try to encompass all European countries.

In the years 2001 to 2004, the EYP encountered various problems of financial nature.
On November 4, 2004, however, the European Youth Parliament was reborn due to a mutual agreement between representatives of EYP's Board of National Committees, alumni and the Heinz-Schwarzkopf Foundation. The EYP's status since then has been a programme of the Schwarzkopf-Stiftung Junges Europa, and is hosted in Berlin, Germany.

The actual activities of the EYP never faltered during this period.

Since 2004, the EYP has introduced several reforms to introduce more transparency in its institutions and further enlarged its activities.

Management 
At the international level, the EYP is governed by an international board, the Governing Body. The Governing Body has six members elected by the National Committees and by the alumni of past sessions. A representative of the Schwarzkopf Foundation is also a member. 
The board is largely responsible for the quality assurance of the International Sessions but also takes responsibility for the overall direction of the organisation and the long-term sustainability and protection of the organisation. 
The day-to-day business of the organisation is administered by a hired manager at the International Office in Berlin. Philipp J. Scharff was the manager from 2004 until 2008, Jan Phillip Beck (DE) from 2008 until 2011, Ville Vasaramäki (FI) from 2011 until 2013, Krista Lagus (FI) from 2013 until 2017 and Lukas Fendel (DE) from 2017 to 2020. Anya Suprenenko was appointed as Executive Director in 2020. In 2022, Pauline Chetail (FR) was made acting Executive Director as Anya went on a temporary leave. 

At the national level, the National Committees are free to choose how to manage themselves, provided they comply with basic democratic principles. It is the responsibility of the National Committees to organise and fund their own national sessions. International Sessions can receive limited funding from EYP at the international level but are largely responsible for their economy as well. Sessions are usually funded through sponsorship from various organisations or corporations.

Sessions 
EYP organises three international sessions each year. They are organised in different countries and all European countries are invited to join, not just members of the EU. Each country's national committee selects a delegation to participate in each session, the size of which depends on various factors. The delegates are distributed to different committees, each tasked with addressing a particular topic. 

Other sessions are organized under the supervision of national boards, including Regional Selection Sessions, National Selection Sessions, International Forums, Small Scale Events and Training Days. National Selection Conferences (sessions) are usually where the selection for the delegations sent to International Sessions takes place. The selection process in most countries (notably excluding France) are taken up by a team of Jurors, led by the Head Of Jury (HoJ), which objectively select a number of delegates to "pass" on to the next stage.

Each international session starts with a two-day Teambuilding part, in which delegates get acquainted with each other and start improving the group dynamics of the committee. The delegates play different games which are meant to bring the delegates from an initial shyness stage to a comfortable, open atmosphere optimal for efficient Committee work.

This is followed by four or five days for Committee Work. During this time the delegates discuss a problematic topic on current European political matters and write a resolution on how to deal with the issue. A member of the European Parliament or some alternative expert will generally visit once to answer questions and quickly discuss the topic with the Committee.

The sessions end with a General Assembly, in which the committee resolutions are looked through, altered and approved (or if the resolution is found unacceptable, not approved). If a resolution is approved it is sent on to the European Parliament, for the consideration of MEPs. General Assembly is usually held in some honorary or prestigious location, such as the host country's Houses of Parliament or the main hall of the City Council.

Additionally National Committees of EYP organise several national and regional sessions every year. National sessions are to select a delegation for one of the upcoming international sessions. These sessions are shorter, lasting normally three days and do not invite a member of the European Parliament to the committees. 
Regional sessions are of varying length, from 3 to 7 or 8 days, and in essence imitate international sessions. They have, however, a more constrained budget and tend to be less formal than international sessions. 
For both national and regional sessions, resolutions are not sent on to the European Parliament.

As of Spring 2019, 90 (taking into account the Extraordinary International Session of EYP in Lillehammer, Norway, Winter 2010) international EYP sessions have taken place:

 1st International Session in Fontainebleau, France, 1988
 2nd International Session in Fontainebleau, France, 1989
 3rd International Session in Thessaloniki, Greece, 1989
 4th International Session in Fontainebleau, France, 1990
 5th International Session in Lisbon, Portugal, 1990
 6th International Session in Kronberg, Germany, 1990
 7th International Session in Prague, Czech Republic, 1991
 8th International Session in Barcelona, Spain, 1991
 9th International Session in Oxford, United Kingdom, 1992
 10th International Session in Strasbourg, France, 1992
 11th International Session in Ghent, Belgium, 1992
 12th International Session in Budapest, Hungary, 1993
 13th International Session in Luxembourg, Luxembourg, 1993
 14th International Session in Fontainebleau, France, 1993
 15th International Session in Berlin, Germany, 1994
 16th International Session in Brussels, Belgium, 1994
 17th International Session in Holstebro, Denmark, 1994
 18th International Session in Gothenburg, Sweden, 1995
 19th International Session in Dublin, Ireland, 1995
 20th International Session in Milan, Italy, 1995
 21st International Session in Helsinki, Finland, 1996
 22nd International Session in Munich, Germany, 1996
 23rd International Session in Nicosia, Cyprus, 1996
 24th International Session in Thessaloniki, Greece, 1997
 25th International Session in Barcelona, Spain, 1997
 26th International Session in Edinburgh, United Kingdom, 1997
 27th International Session in Granada, Spain, 1998
 28th International Session in Brussels, Belgium, 1998
 29th International Session in Vienna, Austria, 1998
 30th International Session in Rome, Italy, 1999
 31st International Session in Weimar, Germany, 1999
 32nd International Session in Hämeenlinna, Finland, 1999
 33rd International Session in Athens, Greece, 2000
 34th International Session in Bern, Switzerland, 2000
 35th International Session in Oxford, United Kingdom, 2000
 36th International Session in Stockholm, Sweden, 2001
 37th International Session in Dubrovnik, Croatia, 2001
 38th International Session in Porto, Portugal, 2001
 39th International Session in Riga, Latvia, 2002
 40th International Session in Ghent, Belgium, 2002
 41st International Session in Turin, Italy, 2002
 42nd International Session in Prague, Czech Republic, 2003
 43rd International Session in Dublin, Ireland, 2003
 44th International Session in Tallinn, Estonia, 2003
 45th International Session in Durham, United Kingdom, 2004
 46th International Session in Tábor, Czech Republic, 2004
 47th International Session in Berlin, Germany, 2004
 48th International Session in Stavanger, Norway, Spring 2005
 49th International Session in Basel, Switzerland, Summer 2005
 50th International Session in Bari, Italy, Autumn 2005
 51st International Session in Paris, France, Spring 2006
 52nd International Session in Ventspils-Riga, Latvia, Summer 2006
 53rd International Session in Kyiv, Ukraine, Autumn 2006
 54th International Session in Potsdam, Germany, Spring 2007
 55th International Session in Białystok, Poland, Summer 2007
 56th International Session in Dublin, Ireland, Autumn 2007
 57th International Session in Prague, Czech Republic Spring 2008
 58th International Session in Liverpool, United Kingdom, Summer 2008
 59th International Session  in Rennes, France, Autumn 2008
 60th International Session in Stockholm, Sweden, Spring 2009
 61st International Session in Leuven, Belgium, Summer 2009
 62nd International Session in Helsinki, Finland, Autumn 2009
 63rd International Session in Tromsø, Norway, Spring 2010
 64th International Session in Frankfurt, Germany, Summer 2010
 65th International Session in Lviv, Ukraine, Autumn 2010
 Extraordinary International Session in Lillehammer, Norway, Winter 2010
 66th International Session in Athens, Greece, Spring 2011
 67th International Session in Grenoble, France, Summer 2011
 68th International Session in Zagreb, Croatia, Autumn 2011
 69th International Session in Istanbul, Turkey, Spring 2012
 70th International Session in Tallinn, Estonia, Summer 2012
 71st International Session in Amsterdam, The Netherlands, Autumn 2012
 72nd International Session in Munich, Germany, Spring 2013
73rd International Session in Zurich, Switzerland, Summer 2013
74th International Session in Tbilisi, Georgia, Autumn 2013
75th International Session in Riga, Latvia, Spring 2014
76th International Session in Barcelona, Spain, Summer 2014
77th International Session in Kyiv, Ukraine, Autumn 2014 (cancelled for political instability)
78th International Session in Izmir, Turkey, Spring 2015
79th International Session in Tampere, Finland, Summer 2015
80th International Session in Leipzig, Germany, Autumn 2015
81st International Session in Dublin, Ireland and Belfast, United Kingdom, Spring 2016
82nd International Session in Rennes, France, Summer 2016
83rd International Session in Laax, Switzerland, Autumn 2016
84th International Session in Trondheim, Norway, Spring 2017
85th International Session in Brno, Czech Republic, Summer 2017
86th International Session in Tbilisi, Georgia, Autumn 2017
87th International Session in Vilnius, Lithuania, Summer 2018
88th International Session in Rotterdam, The Netherlands, Autumn 2018
89th International Session in Yerevan, Armenia, Spring 2019
90th International Session in Valencia, Spain, Summer 2019
91st International Session in Hamburg, Germany, Autumn 2019
92nd International Session in Milan, Italy, Spring 2021 (planned for Spring 2020, but due to Covid postponed to 2021)
93rd International Session in Warsaw, Poland, Summer 2021
94th International Session in Ljubljana, Slovenia, Summer 2021
95th International Session in Novi Sad, Serbia, Spring 2022
96th International Session in Riga, Latvia, Summer 2022

Future sessions will include:

97th International Session in Kortrijk, Belgium, Autumn 2022
98th International Session in Tromsø, Norway, Spring 2023
99th International Session in Baku, Azerbaijan, Autumn 2023
100th International Session in Istanbul, Turkey, Spring 2024

See also
 European Youth Parliament – Armenia
 European Youth Parliament - Ireland
 European Youth Parliament – The Netherlands
 European Youth Parliament – Ukraine

References

External links
 European Youth Parliament – official website

Youth organizations based in Europe
Political organizations based in Europe
Youth model government